Anthuroidea is a superfamily of isopod crustaceans, formerly treated as a suborder, Anthuridea. The group is characterised by "an elongate cylindrical body form, without dorsal coxal plates, and with a uropodal exopod attached to the peduncle proximally and dorsally". There are more than 500 described species in 57 genera, arranged across six families:
Antheluridae Poore & Lew Ton, 1988
Anthuridae Leach, 1814
Expanathuridae Poore, 2001
Hyssuridae Wägele, 1981
Leptanthuridae Poore, 2001
Paranthuridae Menzies & Glynn, 1968

References

Cymothoida
Arthropod superfamilies